Mount Warrigal is a large suburb of Shellharbour, New South Wales, Australia. The population, according to the 2016 Australian Census, was 4,909. The suburb is in the Shellharbour City LGA.

Geography
The suburb includes "Native Dog Hill" and its surrounding areas. To the north and west are the shores of Lake Illawarra. With its high elevation above the surrounding areas and close proximity to the lake, the suburb has excellent views of the Pacific Ocean to the east, Lake Illawarra and the Illawarra Escarpment to both the north and west, and Blackbutt Reserve to the south.

Neighbouring suburbs include Lake Illawarra, Warilla, Barrack Heights and Oak Flats.

Facilities
Shellharbour Hospital is located in Madigan Boulevard, Mount Warrigal. Mount Warrigal also has two small shopping complexes and many public reserves, including Freeman Park which is the only dedicated sporting field. The Stockland Shellharbour shopping centre is in close proximity to the suburb.

At the top of the hill is the Mt Warrigal Nursing Home.

Education
Lake Illawarra High School is on the suburb's north east boundary. The suburb has a primary school, Mount Warrigal Public School established in 1967.

References

External links
 Mount Warrigal Public School
 Shellharbour City

City of Shellharbour
Suburbs of Wollongong